is a weekly Japanese seinen manga magazine published by Shogakukan. The first issue was published on October 14, 1980. Food, sports, romance and business are recurring themes in the magazine, and the stories often question conventional values. The magazine is published every Monday. Circulation in 2008 averaged over 300,000 copies, but by 2015 had dropped to 168,250. In 2009 Shogakukan launched a new sister magazine, Monthly Big Comic Spirits.

History
Big Comic Spirits launched on October 14, 1980, as a monthly magazine. The following June, it changed to a semimonthly magazine published on the 15th and 30th days of each month. Beginning in April 1986, the magazine became weekly, with new issues published every Monday.

Currently running manga series

Notable manga artists and series featured
 Buronson and Atsushi Kamijou
DOG LAW
 Tetsuya Sekiya
Bambino!
 Koji Aihara
Koji En
 Inio Asano
Oyasumi Punpun (moved from Young Sunday)
 Dead Dead Demon's Dededede Destruction
 Tatsuya Egawa
Tokyo Daigaku Monogatari
 Hisashi Eguchi
Paparinko Monogatari
 Tooru Fujisawa
Animal Joe
Ai Kozaki
Asahinagu
 Akira Hanasaki and Tetsu Kariya
Oishinbo
 Kengo Hanazawa
I Am a Hero
 Hidenori Hara
Aozora
Yattarou Jan!!
Minna Ikiteru
 Shohei Harumoto
CB Gan
 Mochiru Hoshisato
 Living Game
 Fujihiko Hosono
Gallery Fake
 Ryoichi Ikegami and Kazuo Koike
Crying Freeman
Wounded Man
 Kazurou Inoue
Undead
 Yūgo Ishikawa
 Yoiko
Muneyuki Kaneshiro and Nishida Kensuke 
Jagān
 Junji Ito
 Gyo
 Remina
 Uzumaki
 Takashi Iwashige
Bokkemon
 Masasumi Kakizaki and George Abe
Rainbow: Nisha Rokubō no Shichinin (moved from Young Sunday)
 Atsushi Kamijo
8 -Eight-
 Ryo Kurashina and Taro Sekiguchi
Teiou
 Tsutomu Kamishiro and Yuu Nakahara
Last Inning
 Katsutoshi Kawai
Tomehane! Suzuri Kōkō Shodōbu (moved from Young Sunday)
 Sakyo Komatsu and Tokihiko Ishiki
Nihon Chinbotsu
 Eisaku Kubonouchi
Chocolat
 Kuromaru
Kurosagi (written by Takeshi Natsuhara and moved from Young Sunday)
 Motorō Mase
Ikigami: The Ultimate Limit (moved from Young Sunday)
 Taiyō Matsumoto
Takemitsu Zamurai (written by Issei Ifuku)
 Tekkonkinkreet
 Ping Pong
 Norifusa Mita
 Boys of Summer
Go Nagai
 Iron Virgin Jun
 Yu Nakahara and Ryu Kamio
Last Inning
 Masaharu Noritsuke
Afro Tanaka
 Tobira Oda
Danchi Tomoo
 Noboru Rokuda
 F
 Shūhō Satō
New Say Hello to Blackjack
 Fumi Saimon
 Tokyo Love Story
 Asunaro Hakusho
 Yukizou Saku
Hakuba no Ouji-sama
 Masahito Soda
Subaru
 MOON - Subaru Solitude Standing
 Noboru Takahashi
Mogura no Uta (moved from Young Sunday)
 Rumiko Takahashi
 Maison Ikkoku
 Shin Takahashi
 Ii Hito
 Saikano
 Kentaro Takekuma and Koji Aihara
 Even a Monkey Can Draw Manga
 Yuji Takemura and Yoichi Komori
Master of Sea UMISHI
 Jiro Taniguchi and Jinpachi Mori
Benkei in New York
 Sekiya Tetsuji
Bambino!
 Kei Toume
Momonchi
 Kazuo Umezu
My Name is Shingo
 Naoki Urasawa
 20th Century Boys
 21st Century Boys
 Happy!
 Yawara!
 Reiji Yamada
Coconuts Period -Chikyuu Ondannka wo Tomeru Usagi-
 Naoki Yamamoto
 Dance till Tomorrow
Arigatō
 Believers
 Hideo Yamamoto
 Homunculus
 Yasuhito Yamamoto
Sekido
 Kimio Yanagisawa
Ruri Iro Generation
 Sensha Yoshida
Utsurun Desu.
 Masami Yuki
Birdy the Mighty (moved from Young Sunday)
Hakubo no Chronicle
 Shouhei Manabe
Ushijima the Loan Shark
 Uoto
Chi: On the Movements of the Earth Yukio KatayamaHanamote Katare (moved from Monthly Big Comic Spirits)Furo Girl!''

Notes

References

External links
 

Weekly manga magazines published in Japan
Magazines established in 1980
Shogakukan magazines
Seinen manga magazines
Magazines published in Tokyo